XG or xG may refer to:

Organizations
 XG Technology, a wireless communications company
 SunExpress Deutschland (IATA code XG, 2011-2020), a German leisure airline headquartered in Frankfurt, Germany
 Clickair (IATA code XG, 2006-2009), a former low-cost airline based in Spain

Science and technology
 Xg antigen system, a red blood cell surface antigen system
 DARPA XG, a DARPA communication program
 Hyundai XG, a Hyundai car model
 Yamaha XG, a Yamaha extension to the General MIDI standard

Other uses
 XG (group), a Japanese girl group
 Extreme-G, a video game
 Expected goals (xG), a performance metric used to evaluate football team and player performance